Bordano is a comune (municipality) in the Province of Udine in the Italian region Friuli-Venezia Giulia, located about  northwest of Trieste and about  northwest of Udine, on the right bank of the Tagliamento river.

Bordano borders the following municipalities: Cavazzo Carnico, Gemona del Friuli, Trasaghis, Venzone.

References

External links
 Official website

Cities and towns in Friuli-Venezia Giulia